John Johnsen may refer to:

John Johnsen (swimmer) (1892–1984), Norwegian swimmer
John Johnsen (footballer) (1895–1969), Norwegian international footballer

See also
John Johnson (disambiguation)
J. Erik Jonsson (1901–1995), co-founder and former president of Texas Instruments Incorporated